Jaya Jayahe Telangana is a song that was purported to be the state song of the Indian state of Telangana. It was composed by Ande Sri. The song was adopted by many organisations and schools in Telangana during the Telangana movement, replacing "Maa Telugu Talliki". On 16 March 2021, in the Telangana State Assembly, Chief Minister K. Chandrashekhar Rao clarified that Jaya Jayahe Telangana has not currently been officially adopted as the state song of Telangana.

Lyrics

See also
Telangana Thalli
Telangana Language Day
List of Telangana poets
National Anthem of Kingdom of Hyderabad
List of Indian state songs

References

External links
Jaya Jayahe Telangana

Indian state songs
Culture of Telangana